A list of thriller films released in the 1940s.

Notes

1940s
Thriller